The Lodgepole Opera House is a historic building in Lodgepole, Nebraska. It was built by Frank Isenberger in 1911. Besides the performing arts, it hosted basketball games and events for organizations like the YMCA, the Commercial Club and the Ladies' Aid Society. The building was called "an ornament to the city" by the Lodge Pole Express in 1911. It has been listed on the National Register of Historic Places since July 7, 1988.

References

National Register of Historic Places in Cheyenne County, Nebraska
Buildings and structures completed in 1911
1911 establishments in Nebraska